Suphan Buri railway station is a railway station on the Suphan Buri Line in Tambon Rua Yai, Mueang Suphan Buri District, Suphan Buri Province, Thailand. There are two platforms, on the left side of the track. The station is now operational. Two trains stop at it. It is the Suphan Buri provincial station, but passenger count is low due to its distance from Suphan Buri's city centre.

Services 
 Commuter Train No. 355 Bangkok–Suphan Buri
 Commuter Train No. 356 Suphan Buri–Bangkok

References

External links
 

Railway stations in Thailand